The Chief Technology Officer of the Department of Health and Human Services is the top information technology development official in the United States Department of Health and Human Services.  The position was established in 2009.

List of officeholders

See also 
 Chief Technology Officer of the United States

References 

American chief technology officers
Science and technology in the United States
2009 establishments in the United States
United States Department of Health and Human Services officials